A total lunar eclipse occurred on 15–16 May 2022, the first of two total lunar eclipses in 2022. the event occurred near lunar perigee; as a result, this event was referred to some in media coverage as a "super flower blood moon" and elsewhere as a "super blood moon", a supermoon that coincides with a total lunar eclipse. This was the longest total lunar eclipse visible from nearly all of North America since August 17, 1989 until the next eclipse on November 8.

The eclipse was a dark one with the northern limb of the Moon passing through the center of Earth's shadow. This was the first central eclipse of Lunar Saros 131.

This lunar eclipse was the third of an almost tetrad, the others being 26 May 2021 (T), 19 Nov 2021 (P) and 08 Nov 2022 (T).

Visibility
The eclipse was completely visible over most of North and South America, seen rising over Northwest North America, and the Pacific Ocean, and setting over Africa and Europe. It was the longest eclipse in prime time on the US west coast this century. Because of thunderstorms, clouds covered regions of the US.

Observations

North and South America

Europe

Related eclipses

Eclipses of 2022 
 A partial solar eclipse on 30 April.
 A total lunar eclipse on 16 May.
 A partial solar eclipse on 25 October.
 A total lunar eclipse on 8 November.

Lunar year series

Saros series

This is the first of the series that passes through the center of the Earth's shadow. The last occurrence was on May 2004 lunar eclipse. The next occurrence is May 2040 lunar eclipse.

Metonic series
This eclipse is the third of four Metonic cycle lunar eclipses on the same date, 15–16 May, each separated by 19 years.

The Moon's path through the Earth's shadow near its descending node progresses southward through each sequential eclipse. The second and third are total eclipses.

Tritos 
 Preceded: Lunar eclipse of June 15, 2011

 Followed: Lunar eclipse of April 14, 2033

Tzolkinex 
 Preceded: Lunar eclipse of April 4, 2015

 Followed: Lunar eclipse of June 26, 2029

Half-Saros cycle
A lunar eclipse will be preceded and followed by solar eclipses by 9 years and 5.5 days (a half saros). This lunar eclipse is related to two annular solar eclipses of Solar Saros 138.

See also
List of lunar eclipses and List of 21st-century lunar eclipses

Notes

References

External links

2022-05
2022-05
2022 in science